Battle Cry is a live video released by Judas Priest on 25 March 2016 on DVD and on 1 April 2016 on Blu-ray. It was filmed at the Wacken Open Air festival on 1 August 2015 in front of a capacity of 85,000 people. A CD version was also released bundled with the DVD version as well. Both DVD and Blu-ray formats contain three bonus tracks recorded from their 10 December 2015 show at the Ergo Arena in Gdańsk, Poland.

Reception
Chad Bowar of Loudwire stated "Priest have released a plethora of live albums over the years, and Battle Cry is a worthy addition to that canon. It effectively captures this era of the band, who have aged extremely gracefully and show no signs of slowing down any time soon."

Track listing
All songs written by Rob Halford, Glenn Tipton and K.K. Downing, except where indicated.

Charts

Personnel
Rob Halford – Vocals
Glenn Tipton – Guitar, Vocals
Richie Faulkner – Guitar, Vocals
Ian Hill – Bass
Scott Travis – Drums

References

Judas Priest video albums
Albums produced by Tom Allom
2016 live albums